The Old University Library in Lincoln, Nebraska is a historic three-and-a-half story building on the campus of the University of Nebraska–Lincoln. It was built with red bricks in 1891, and designed in the Richardsonian Romanesque style by Mendelssohn, Fisher & Lawrie. When it was dedicated in 1895, it housed the university library, an art gallery, and the Nebraska State Historical Society. By the 1970s, it housed the Department of Architecture. It has been listed on the National Register of Historic Places since August 6, 1975.

References

National Register of Historic Places in Lancaster County, Nebraska
Richardsonian Romanesque architecture in Nebraska
Library buildings completed in 1895
School buildings completed in 1895
University and college academic libraries in the United States
University of Nebraska–Lincoln